John Gordon, (July 15, 1759 – June 6, 1819) was an American pioneer, Indian trader, planter, and militia captain in several Indian wars. Part of the post-Revolutionary War settlement of the trans-Appalachian frontier, Gordon was an early settler in the  Nashville, Tennessee area. He gained notability and rank in the Tennessee Militia, fighting against the Creeks and Seminoles for Andrew Jackson, during the War of 1812.  Jackson referred to him as his "Captain of the Spies."

Partnering with a Chickasaw chieftain, Gordon helped improve the Natchez Trace, which gave access to the settlers pushing into western Tennessee and south into the Louisiana and Mississippi territories. He was a key figure major battles of the Creek War, including the Battle of Horseshoe Bend, and the capture of Pensacola from the British.

Early life and Tennessee settler 

Gordon was born in Spotsylvania County, Virginia to an aristocratic landholding family. His father had fought in the War of Independence as a lieutenant, and settled the family in Nashville after the war.

As a young man, John Gordon made a name for himself as an Indian fighter, riding with the militia to investigate reports of attacks on cabins and farmsteads around Nashville. In 1793 he was commissioned by Territorial Governor William Blount as a captain in the militia.  In 1794, he rode in the Nickajack campaign against the Chickamauga Cherokee, who violently defended their Tennessee River Gorge homeland.

After Tennessee statehood in 1796, Gordon was appointed its first postmaster, a position also later held by his son-in-law, Confederate States General Felix Kirk Zollicoffer. Gordon had a plantation in Nashville where he made money from horse racing, but was eventually forced to sell the land to pay off debts. During this time, Gordon married Dorothea "Dolly" Cross, the daughter of another Virginian who had settled in Nashville. Cross and Gordon, coming from the first families of Virginia, were both descended from Pocahontas.

Later career 
It was in the militia that Gordon first came in contact with the Chickasaw Indians, with whom he would maintain friendly contact throughout his life. He later acquired some land within the Chickasaw Nation in present day Hickman County on the Duck River.  Here he established a plantation of over fifteen-hundred acres. The land was located at a spot where the Natchez Trace, the old Indian trail then used by settlers going into the Mississippi Territory, crossed the Duck River. In a partnership with Chickasaw Chief William "Chooshemataha" Colbert, Gordon provided ferry service and ran a trading post along the trace. The Chickasaw ceded the land to Tennessee in 1805 and Gordon moved his family to a large house there in 1812. The Gordon House is still there, now maintained by the National Park Service as part of the Natchez Trace National Parkway.

The Creek Wars 

Now referred to as "Captain of the Spies" in the Tennessee state militia, Gordon led militiamen and friendly Indians against "hostiles" armed by the British in the War of 1812. It was during this time that the Muscogee Creek Confederacy dissolved into a civil war, with traditionalist Creek "Red Sticks" calling for the Creek people to stop ceding land to the United States and adopting western styles of society and agriculture. The Creek Nation called on Tennessee to help put down the so-called "Red Stick rebellion", named for the painted red war clubs brandished by the Creek priests. It was in the militia that Gordon made the acquaintance of Andrew Jackson, who led the campaign.  When starving Tennesseans threatened to mutiny against "Old Hickory", Gordon was the first to answer Jackson's plea "If only two men remain with me, I will never abandon this fort," to which Captain Gordon replied, "You have one, general; let's look to see if we can't find another."

Gordon fought against the Red Sticks in 1813 at the Battle of Talladega; and later at the Battle of Horseshoe Bend in 1814 (where Jackson noted him for his courage, saying: "... Captain Gordon who was in front at [the head] of the spies rushed to the fight, and entered into the persuit  ...")

Horseshoe Bend was the scene of the defeat of the Red Sticks.  Gordon and Cherokee Chief Major Ridge were noted leaders of the conflict. Jackson then forced the Creeks into a crippling land cession of over 23 million acres in present day Alabama and Georgia as part of the Treaty of Fort Jackson.

Pensacola 
Gordon provided the reconnaissance for Jackson's controversial capture of Pensacola which led to the Battle of New Orleans. After Horseshoe Bend, Jackson instructed Gordon to secretly go to Pensacola to see if the British were using the Spanish fort as a base to provide Creek and Seminole Indians with arms. Gordon went on the dangerous mission, passing through Creek territory, and barely escaped after having found the British flag flying at Pensacola and British troops arming Creek warriors.

Gordon's son-in-law, Felix Zollicoffer, wrote in an article about the affair:

It was Capt. Gordon who performed that memorable and perilous service of penetrating alone a forest 300 miles from Hickory Grounds to Pensacola, encountering and evading various Indian parties, and procuring for Gen. Jackson that valuable knowledge of Spanish fortifications and of the Spanish complicity with British and Indian enemies which at once determined him upon and gave him the key to the famous capture of Pensacola.

With Gordon's affirmative report, Jackson captured the town with use of the Tennessee Militia, angering many in the Federal Government.

Return home 
During their marriage, Gordon's wife, Dolly, raised eleven children and oversaw the planting of cotton and orchards, and the construction of the house that still stands today on the banks of the Duck River. By some accounts, Dolly served as friend and nurse to the many Indians (probably Chickasaw), who remained in the area or who made regular use of Gordon's ferry and trading post.

Death
In 1818, Jackson asked Gordon to accompany him on a campaign into Florida that became known as the First Seminole War. The harsh climate of Florida proved to be too much for Gordon, however, and he died later in 1819 at his home. Dolly remained in the home until her death in 1859. Gordon and Dolly are buried at Rose Hill Cemetery in Columbia, Tennessee.

References 

1759 births
1819 deaths
American pioneers
Chickasaw
American militia officers
Tennessee culture
Appalachia
Creek War
History of Tennessee
History of Alabama
Native American history of Alabama
People of the Creek War